This article features a listing of the professional sports teams based in Canada organized by Census Metropolitan Area or Census Agglomeration. Canada has professional sports teams in eight sports across twenty leagues. Canadian teams compete in top-level American and Canadian-based leagues, including three of the four major professional sports leagues. Canada also has minor league teams competing in American and Canadian-based basketball, hockey, soccer, and baseball leagues.

The Toronto Six began play in the 2020–21 National Women's Hockey League season as Canada's only professional women's team following the collapse of the Canadian Women's Hockey League in 2019.

See also 

 List of American and Canadian cities by number of major professional sports franchises
 List of professional sports teams in the United States and Canada
 List of professional sports teams in Ontario
 List of professional sports teams in Quebec

References 

professional sports teams in Canada by city